The Hollywood Master Blasters are an American professional Twenty20 cricket franchise that competes in Minor League Cricket (MiLC). The team is based in Los Angeles, California. It was formed in 2020 as part of 24 original teams to compete in Minor League Cricket. The franchise is owned by Janak Patel.

The team's home ground is the Leo Magnus Cricket Complex, located in Van Nuys, California. American veteran Nisarg Patel helms captaincy duties, with South African cricketer Cody Chetty standing by as vice-captain.

Cody Chetty and Khalid Khan top the batting and bowling leaderboards with 470 runs and 13 wickets respectively.

Franchise history

Background 
Talks of an American Twenty20 league started in November 2018 just before USA Cricket became the new governing body of cricket in the United States. In May 2021, USA Cricket announced they had accepted a bid by American Cricket Enterprises (ACE) for a US$1 billion investment covering the league and other investments benefitting the U.S. national teams.

In an Annual General Meeting on February 21, 2020, it was announced that USA Cricket was planning to launch Major League Cricket in 2021 and Minor League Cricket that summer, but it was delayed due to the COVID-19 pandemic and due to the lack of high-quality cricket stadiums in the USA. Major League Cricket was pushed to a summer-2023 launch and Minor League Cricket was pushed back to July 31, 2021.

USA Cricket CEO Iain Higgins also pointed out cities such as New York City, Houston and Los Angeles with a large cricket fanbase, and targeted them among others as launch cities for Minor League Cricket.

Exhibition league 
In July 2020, the player registration for the Minor League Cricket exhibition league began. On August 15, 2020, USA Cricket announced the teams participating in the exhibition league matches, also listing the owners for each team. The draft for the exhibition league began on August 22, 2020, with the Hollywood Master Blasters releasing their squad on August 24. Amitoze Singh was later named as captain for the Hollywood Master Blasters for the exhibition league. However, the Blasters didn't play a single game due to COVID-19 restrictions.

2021 season 

After the conclusion of the exhibition league, USA Cricket announced that they were planning to launch the inaugural season of Minor League Cricket in spring 2021. Ahead of the official season, which was announced to kick off on July 31, the Lashings announced Nisarg Patel as captain with Cody Chetty helming vice-captain duties.

In their first match of the season, the Blasters lost by 5 wickets to the Surf Riders. The Blasters only won twice throughout the league, once against the Strikers, and once against the Lashings. They lost against the Grizzlies twice, the Strikers, the Thunderbolts twice, the Blazers twice, the Surf Riders, the Lashings, the Hurricanes, the Athletics, and the Mustangs. The Blasters finished off with 2 wins and 13 losses, finishing bottom of the table in their group, thus missing the play-offs.

2022 season 
Ahead of the 2022 season, Major League Cricket announced that the draft for that season would take place on May 12.

Current squad 
 Players with international caps are listed in bold.
  denotes a player who is currently unavailable for selection.
  denotes a player who is unavailable for rest of the season

Statistics

Most runs 

Source: CricClubs, Last updated: 19 March 2022

Most wickets 

Source: CricClubs, Last updated: 19 March 2022

See also 
 Cricket in the United States
 2021 Minor League Cricket season
 2021 Minor League Cricket season squads
 2021 Minor League Cricket season final
 Minor League Cricket
 Major League Cricket 
 Houston Hurricanes (cricket)
 Seattle Thunderbolts
 Silicon Valley Strikers
 DC Hawks
 SoCal Lashings
 New Jersey Stallions (cricket)

References 

Minor League Cricket teams
Cricket teams in Los Angeles
Cricket clubs established in 2020
2020 establishments in California